Andrea Fletcher Harrison (née Andrea Carleen Fletcher) is an American politician. She currently serves in the Maryland House of Delegates, representing district 24 in Prince George's County, Maryland. She previously served on the Prince George's County Council, representing district 5.

Early life and education
Andrea Carleen Fletcher was born in Washington, D.C., to James C. Fletcher. She received an Associate in Arts in micro computer systems from Prince George's Community College in 1992. She then received a Bachelor of Arts degree in public policy from Bowie State University in 2002.

Career
Before getting into politics in 2002, Harrison was active with the Ardmore Springdale Civic Association, serving as its president, vice president, and secretary from 1994 to 2007.

After the death of Gwendolyn T. Britt on January 12, 2008, Prince George's County councilmember David C. Harrington was appointed to serve the rest of Britt's term in the Maryland Senate. A special election was held to fill the rest of Harrington's term on the County Council. Harrison won the Democratic primary to fill the seat on April 2, 2008, edging out Edmonston mayor Adam Ortiz by 137 votes. She was sworn in on May 19, 2008, and represented district 5 until December 3, 2019. She was the first woman to represent the seat, which was previously held by her father. In 2012, she was elected to chair the county council.

In 2016, Harrison campaigned in support of a referendum to expand the county council, which led to speculation as to whether she would seek re-election to the council. She declined running for either of the two at-large positions on the council, instead announcing her candidacy for the Maryland House of Delegates in district 24 on December 14, 2017. During the primary, she was endorsed by U.S. Representative Anthony Brown. She won the Democratic primary, coming in third place in a field of 11 candidates with 14.5 percent of the vote.

In the legislature
Harrison was sworn into the Maryland House of Delegates on January 9, 2019.

Committee assignments
 Member, Economic Matters Committee, 2021 (banking, consumer protection & commercial law subcommittee, 2022–present; public utilities subcommittee, 2022–present)
 Member, Study Group on Economic Stability, 2019–present
 Member, Joint Audit and Evaluation Committee, 2020–present
 House Chair, Protocol Committee, 2020–present
 Member, Joint Committee on Fair Practices and State Personnel Oversight, 2022–present
 Member, Environment and Transportation Committee, 2019–2021 (local government & bi-county agencies subcommittee, 2019–2021; motor vehicle & transportation subcommittee, 2019–2021)

Other memberships
 Member, Legislative Black Caucus of Maryland, 2019–present
 Member, Women Legislators of Maryland, 2019–present

Personal life
She is married with three children. She lives in Springdale, Maryland.

Political positions

Minimum wage
In 2013, Harrison introduced a bill to raise the minimum wage in Prince George's County to $11.50 an hour by 2016. The bill passed and was signed into law with an effective date of 2017 on December 17, 2013.

Social issues
In 2011, following a proposal to open a casino at Rosecroft Raceway, Harrison co-sponsored legislation to ban slots in Prince George's County. The county council voted in November to table the bill in a 5-4 vote, with Harrison voting against the table. In 2012, Harrison voted for a resolution voicing the county council's opposition to a bill introduced in the Maryland General Assembly that would allow casinos to be built in Prince George's County.

In 2013, Harrison, alongside county executive Rushern Baker, wrote a letter to Dan Tangherlini to endorse a plan to move the headquarters for the Federal Bureau of Investigation to Greenbelt, Maryland.

Electoral history

Notes
 

1963 births
Living people
Bowie State University alumni
Politicians from Washington, D.C.
People from Prince George's County, Maryland
African-American state legislators in Maryland
21st-century American politicians
Democratic Party members of the Maryland House of Delegates
21st-century American women politicians
Women state legislators in Maryland
21st-century African-American women
21st-century African-American politicians
20th-century African-American people
20th-century African-American women
County commissioners in Maryland